Bibhash Chakraborty (alternatively spelt Bibhas Chakraborty; born 23 September 1937) is an Indian Bengali actor and theatre personality. He is also a social activist. He is a prolific writer too. He was associated with Paschim Banga Natya Akademi for many years.

Early life 
Chakraborty was born on 23 September 1937 in Sylhet, British India (currently Bangladesh). He used to stay near the Burma border, and his childhood years were affected by the worries of a possible Japanese attack during World War II.

Career 
In the beginning of acting career, Bibhash Chakraborty joined Bohurupee, however his sting with Bohurupee was disappointing. In 1960s he joined the Bengali theatre group Nandikar. In Nandikar, he acted in several plays directed by Ajitesh Bandopadhyay. He left Nandikar in 1966 and formed "Theatre Workshop". During these days, he directed several plays such as Rajrakta (written by Mohit Chattopadhyay), Chakbhanga Modhu (written by Manoj Mitra) etc.  The drama Rajarakta was a very significant one in the history of Bengali theatre. 

In 1985, he formed a Bengali theatre group "Anya Theatre". 

Chakraborty was associated with Paschim Banga Natya Akademi for many years as a member, almost from the institution's inception. In 2018 he resigned from the institution citing age reason.

Filmography 
 Aamaar Bhuvan (2002)
 Path-o-Prasad (1991)
 Amar Prithibi (1985)
  Parashuram (1979)
 Chhera Tamsuk (1974)

Awards 
In 1989 Bibhas Chakraborty received Sangeet Natak Akademi Award.

References

External links 
 

Living people
Bengali theatre personalities
1937 births
People from Sylhet
Recipients of the Sangeet Natak Akademi Award